Rika Ishida (born 18 June 1981) is a Japanese former field hockey player who competed in the 2004 Summer Olympics.

References

External links
 

1981 births
Living people
Japanese female field hockey players
Olympic field hockey players of Japan
Field hockey players at the 2004 Summer Olympics